Montagnieu may refer to:

Montagnieu, Ain
Montagnieu, Isère